Russell William Flower (born 6 November 1942) is a former English cricketer. Flower was a left-handed batsman who bowled slow left-arm orthodox. He was born in Stone, Staffordshire.

Flower made his debut for Staffordshire in the 1964 Minor Counties Championship against Norfolk. Flower played Minor counties cricket for Staffordshire from 1964 to 1988, which included 107 Minor Counties Championship matches. and 4 MCCA Knockout Trophy matches. Following success with over the course of a decade with Staffordshire, Flower played first-class cricket for Warwickshire in 1978, making his debut against Surrey. Flower played 9 first-class matches that season, although without success. He took just 10 wickets at an expensive average of 55.40, with best figures of 3/45. Dropped midway through the season, Flower never appeared again for Warwickshire.

Continuing his Minor counties career with Staffordshire, he proceeded to make his List A debut for the Minor Counties cricket team against Yorkshire in the 1982 Benson & Hedges Cup. He made a further appearance for the team in that season's competition against Leicestershire. He played his first limited overs match for Staffordshire against Gloucestershire in the NatWest Trophy. He made 3 further List A appearances for the county, the last coming against Surrey in the 1988 NatWest Trophy. Like in his first-class career, Russell struggled against first-class opposition. He took just 2 wickets in List A cricket, at an expensive average of 93.00 runs per wicket. It was only in one of his six matches that he took wickets, taking 2/34 against Glamorgan in the 1986 NatWest Trophy.

References

External links
Russell Flower at ESPNcricinfo
Russell Flower at CricketArchive

1942 births
Living people
People from Stone, Staffordshire
English cricketers
Staffordshire cricketers
Warwickshire cricketers
Minor Counties cricketers